is a railway station on the Himi Line in Takaoka, Toyama Prefecture, Japan, operated by West Japan Railway Company (JR West).

Lines 

Station layout 
The station has a single island platform, serving two tracks, connected by a footbridge. The station has a "Midori no Madoguchi" staffed ticket office.

Platforms

Adjacent stations

History
The station opened on 29 December 1900. With the privatization of Japanese National Railways (JNR) on 1 April 1987, the station came under the control of JR West.

Passenger statistics
In fiscal 2015, the station was used by an average of 264 passengers daily (boarding passengers only).

Surrounding area
 Fushiki Port
 Takaoka Municipal Fushiki Elementary School

See also
 List of railway stations in Japan

References

External links

  

Railway stations in Toyama Prefecture
Stations of West Japan Railway Company
Railway stations in Japan opened in 1900
Himi Line
Takaoka, Toyama